The Kenya-Turbi City massacre was the killing of about sixty people by feuding clans in the Marsabit District  of northern Kenya on the early morning of 12 July 2005. Hundreds of armed raiders of the Borana tribe attacked the Gabbra people living in the Turbi area, north west of Marsabit. Twenty-two of the sixty confirmed dead were children, and over six thousand people fled their homes, most of them fleeing to Marsabit town.

Dynamics 
The fighting was a result of competition over scarce water and pasture land in the arid region along the Ethiopia border, as well as a recent political division along ethnic lines. The fighting in Turbi is similar in cause to that between the Garre and the Murule in Mandera in January and February 2005. Cattle rustling is relatively common practice in this region, and some reports suggest that the massacre may have begun as a cattle raid. The Gabra people, victims of the massacre, had been accused in June of stealing hundreds of cattle and goats.

A week after the massacre, Kenyan Red Cross reported that Marsabit had around nine thousand displaced persons, mainly Gabra people. The Red Cross appealed for KSh.53.9 million/= (US$709,000) in aid, but received only a small proportion of what they had asked for. The people of Marsabit have long complained that they are overlooked by central government. The wounded of Turbi had to travel 130 km to reach Marsabit hospital, which has only one doctor.

Three days after the massacre, with ethnic tensions still running high, the Roman Catholic Bishop of Zica, Luigi Locati, was shot dead in Isiolo. Although Isiolo lies quite a distance south of Marsabit, it has the same ethnic and religious makeup. In both places, about 40% of the people are Christians, 32% Muslims and other 28% believe in traditional or other religions.

See also
 List of massacres in Kenya
 Cattle raiding in Kenya

References

External links

BBC coverage
 Kenya's wild north: Hostile area, hostile groups (13 July).
  Kenya massacre: Survivor's tales (13 July).
  In pictures: Kenya massacre (14 July).
 Catholic bishop killed in Kenya (15 July 2005).
  Extreme tension in Kenyan village (16 July).
 Seven arrested over Kenya attack (18 July 2005).

IRIN coverage
 KENYA: 9,000 now displaced in tense Marsabit — Kenya Red Cross (18 July).
 KENYA: Conflict over resources in border areas (1 August).

Marsabit County
Politics of Kenya
2005 in Kenya
Massacres in Kenya
Mass murder in 2005
July 2005 events in Africa